= Franco-Austrian War (disambiguation) =

The term Franco-Austrian War primarily refers to the Second Italian War of Independence.

Franco-Austrian War may also refer to any of a number of wars between France and Austria:

- Part of the Thirty Years' War (1635–1648)
- The Franco-Dutch War (1672–1678)
- The War of the Grand Alliance (1688–1697)
- The War of the Spanish Succession (1701–1714)
- The War of the Polish Succession (1733–1735)
- The War of the Austrian Succession (1741–1748)
- The French Revolutionary Wars:
  - War of the First Coalition (1792–1797)
  - War of the Second Coalition (1798–1801)
- Parts of the Napoleonic Wars:
  - War of the Third Coalition (1805)
  - War of the Fifth Coalition (1809)
  - War of the Sixth Coalition (1813–1814)
- World War I (1914–1918)
